The 2011 IRB Junior World Championship was the fourth annual international rugby union competition for Under 20 national teams, this competition replaced the now defunct under 19 and under 21 world championships. The event was organised by rugby's governing body, the International Rugby Board (IRB). The winners were New Zealand, who won all the competitions held since the inaugural year in 2008.

Venues

Four stadia will be used for this world cup. There will be four double header match days at the three smaller venues with the final to be played in Stadio Euganeo.

Teams

Pool stage
All times are local (UTC+2).

Pool A

{| class="wikitable" style="text-align: center;"
|-
!width="200"|Team
!width="20"|Pld
!width="20"|W
!width="20"|D
!width="20"|L
!width="20"|TF
!width="20"|PF
!width="20"|PA
!width="25"|PD
!width="20"|BP
!width="20"|Pts
|-
|align=left| 
|3||3||0||0||30||204||22||+182||3||15
|-
|align=left| 
|3||2||0||1||12||90||106||−16||2||10
|-
|align=left| 
|3||1||0||2||6||50||85||−35||0||4
|-
|align=left| 
|3||0||0||3||1||16||147||−131||0||0
|}

Pool B

{| class="wikitable" style="text-align: center;"
|-
!width="200"|Team
!width="20"|Pld
!width="20"|W
!width="20"|D
!width="20"|L
!width="20"|TF
!width="20"|PF
!width="20"|PA
!width="25"|PD
!width="20"|BP
!width="20"|Pts
|-
|align=left| 
|3||3||0||0||11||82||51||+31||2||14
|-
|align=left| 
|3||2||0||1||19||129||63||+66||3||11
|-
|align=left| 
|3||1||0||2||7||73||92||−19||1||5
|-
|align=left| 
|3||0||0||3||5||39||117||−78||0||0
|}

Pool C

{| class="wikitable" style="text-align: center;"
|-
!width="200"|Team
!width="20"|Pld
!width="20"|W
!width="20"|D
!width="20"|L
!width="20"|TF
!width="20"|PF
!width="20"|PA
!width="25"|PD
!width="20"|BP
!width="20"|Pts
|-
|align=left| 
|3||3||0||0||12||98||63||+35||2||14
|-
|align=left| 
|3||2||0||1||10||95||52||+43||3||11
|-
|align=left| 
|3||1||0||2||6||81||88||−7||0||4
|-
|align=left| 
|3||0||0||3||3||31||102||−71||0||0
|}

Knockout stage

9–12th place play-offs

Semifinals

11th place game

9th place game

5–8th place play-offs

Semifinals

7th place game

5th place game

Finals

Semifinals

Third place game

Final

Statistics

Top point scorers

Top try scorers

References

External links

2011
2011 rugby union tournaments for national teams
2010–11 in Italian rugby union
International rugby union competitions hosted by Italy
rugby union